Bolans is a community on the south-western end of the island of Antigua, headtown of the Saint Mary's Parish.  It was once an agrarian community but has slowly been transformed into a centre of tourist activity.  There are those in the community who involve themselves in agricultural activity, more as an avenue of feeding themselves or adding some needed income.  Bolans is home to the world-famous Jolly Beach Resort as well as Jolly Harbour Marina and Boatyard which provides a sheltered dockage with 24-hour security and a full-service boatyard. It had a population of 1,888 in 2001.

Demographics 
Bolands has eight enumeration districts.

 80100 Bolans-JollyBeach 
 80200 Bolans-Tottenham 
 80300 BolansHill 
 80401 Bolans-JollyH_1 
 80402 Bolans-JollyH_2 
 80500 Bolans-CentralWest 
 80600 Bolans-CentralEast 
 80700 BolansClinic

References 

 

Populated places in Antigua and Barbuda
Saint Mary Parish, Antigua and Barbuda